Sher-E-Hindustan may refer to:
 Sher-E-Hindustan (1998 film), an Indian Hindi-language action drama film
 Sher-E-Hindustan (2019 film), an Indian Bhojpuri-language action drama film